The 1904 Washington Agricultural football team was an American football team that represented Washington Agricultural College during the 1904 college football season. The team competed as an independent under head coach Everett Sweeley, and compiled a record

Schedule

References

Washington Agricultural
Washington State Cougars football seasons
Washington Agricultural football